Abel Clemmons (1772 - 1806) (also referred to as Abel Clemmens in sources) was an American murderer, known for killing his entire family in late 1805.

Abel Clemmons and his family lived on the lands of Col. George Jackson, about one-half mile outside of Clarksburg, West Virginia (then Virginia). Clemmons lived with his family in an affectionate manner and they bore the character of honesty and industry. As of the fall of 1805, he was about thirty-three years old, 5'7" tall, built strong, of fair complexion, light-haired, and had lost some of his front teeth. In the weeks prior to the murder of his family, he was observed to be gloomy and melancholy, presumably due to great anxiety for the welfare of his large family. He was the father of five daughters, two sons, and an infant of unknown gender. A niece occasionally stayed in the home. For some time, Clemmons had planned to remove himself to Ohio.

On November 10, 1805, in Clarksburg, West Virginia (then Virginia), Clemmons murdered his pregnant wife and eight children with an axe. The Virginia Argus, in a letter composed by John G. Jackson, George Jackson, William Tate, and Elias Stillwell, stated Clemmons had killed them while they were asleep in three separate beds in the same room. A man named Neisly, who purchased a part of Clemmons' crop, went early in the morning to the Clemmons house. Finding Clemmons in a state of agitation and insanity, he assumed the family was asleep. He saw the niece, who had no knowledge of the killings although she had been present in the house. Neisly left the home, unsuspicious of what happened. A brother of Clemmons, who lived some miles away and had plans to move with him to Ohio, visited his home and found the oldest boy dead in his bed. He ran to alarm his neighbors, while Clemmons fled. Neighbors gathered in and found what the Argus described as "a scene the most shocking to relate": the wife and an infant in one bed, four daughters in another, and two boys and a girl in a third bed.

The story was published by Joseph Campbell of the Monongalia Gazette which became an early "horror classic."  After committing the murders, he hid in a cliff of rocks on the north side of the town, but surrendered after a few days.

Clemmons, who was taken into custody in early December 1805, pleaded not guilty at his Morgantown trial in May 1806. He was found guilty and hanged from a locust tree near Decker's Creek in the town on June 30, 1806. A 1910 local history book opined that Clemmons was likely insane, but that was not a valid defense at the time.

References

1772 births
1806 deaths
American mass murderers
American murderers of children
Executed mass murderers
People from Clarksburg, West Virginia
People executed by Virginia by hanging
Familicides
Stabbing attacks in the United States
Axe murder